The 2019 Kobe Challenger was a professional tennis tournament played on indoor hard courts. It was the 5th edition of the tournament which was part of the 2019 ATP Challenger Tour. It took place in Kobe, Japan between 4 and 10 November 2019.

Singles main-draw entrants

Seeds

 1 Rankings are as of 28 October 2019.

Other entrants
The following players received wildcards into the singles main draw:
  Shinji Hazawa
  Taisei Ichikawa
  Yuki Mochizuki
  Ryota Tanuma
  Seita Watanabe

The following player received entry into the singles main draw using a protected ranking:
  Bradley Mousley

The following players received entry into the singles main draw as alternates:
  Ken Onishi
  Takashi Saito

The following players received entry from the qualifying draw:
  Yuta Kawahashi
  Timur Khabibulin

The following players received entry as lucky losers:
  Ren Nakamura
  Kazuki Nishiwaki

Champions

Singles

 Yosuke Watanuki def.  Yūichi Sugita 6–2, 6–4.

Doubles

 Purav Raja /  Ramkumar Ramanathan def.  André Göransson /  Christopher Rungkat 7–6(8–6), 6–3.

References

2019 ATP Challenger Tour
2019
2019 in Japanese tennis
November 2019 sports events in Japan